Alexander Borisovich Goldenweiser (or Goldenveyzer; ; 26 November 1961),  was a Soviet and Russian pianist, teacher and composer.

Goldenweiser was born in Kishinev, Bessarabia, Russia. In 1889 he was admitted to the Moscow Conservatory in the class of Alexander Siloti (also Ziloti). He graduated from the Moscow Conservatory in 1895 in the piano class of Pavel Pabst (previously with  A.I.Siloti), winning the Gold Medal for Piano, in 1897 – in the composition class of Mikhail Ippolitov-Ivanov. He also studied composition with Anton Arensky and counterpoint with Sergei Taneyev (1892–1893).

He joined the faculty of the Conservatory shortly afterward, and during his tenure there, his pupils included Grigory Ginzburg, Lazar Berman, Samuil Feinberg, Rosa Tamarkina, Dmitry Kabalevsky, Galina Eguiazarova, Nikolai Kapustin, Alexander Braginsky, Sulamita Aronovsky, Tatiana Nikolayeva, Dmitry Paperno, Nodar Gabunia, Oxana Yablonskaya, Nelly Akopian-Tamarina, Dmitri Bashkirov, Dmitry Blagoy and many others. 

Rachmaninoff's Second Suite, Op. 17, was dedicated to him as well as Medtner's Lyric Fragments, Op. 23.

He was a close friend of Leo Tolstoy. He published memories of his relationship with Tolstoy in his book Vblizi Tolstogo.

He made a number of renowned recordings as a pianist, including four recordings on piano roll for the Welte-Mignon reproducing piano in 1910. He died in 1961, in Moscow Oblast.

Honours and awards
 People's Artist of the RSFSR (1931)
Stalin Prize, first class (1947)
 Two Orders of Lenin (including 9 March 1945)
 Order of the Red Banner of Labour, three times (27 April 1937, 29 April 1950, 9 March 1955)
 People's Artist of the USSR (1946)

Selective discography
Piano Trio in E minor, Op. 31. Leonid Kogan, violin. Mstislav Rostropovich, cello. Composer, piano. Melodiya D-9123-4 (LP); released 1961
Contrapuntal Sketches, Op. 12. Sonata Fantasia', Op. 37. 'Skazka, Op. 39. Jonathan Powell, piano. Toccata TOCC 044, CD, released 2009. The Contrapuntal Sketches were written in the 1930s. With this work Goldenweiser can perhaps stake claim as being the first Russian composer to write a set of polyphonic pieces in each of the major and minor keys, all of which appear on this recording.
Russian Piano School, Vol 1: Alexander Goldenweiser. Music by Tchaikovsky, Arensky, Borodin, Rachmaninoff (also with G. Ginsburg), Medtner, Goldenweiser – original recordings 1946–1955 by Melodiya. NoNoise transfers distributed BMG 74321 25173 2

References
 The New Grove Dictionary of Music and Musicians London: Macmillan, 1980
 Archive of Alexander Goldenweiser Papers at the International Institute of Social History

Notes

External links
 

1875 births
1961 deaths
20th-century classical pianists
Musicians from Chișinău
People from Kishinyovsky Uyezd
People's Artists of the RSFSR
People's Artists of the USSR
Stalin Prize winners
Recipients of the Order of Lenin
Recipients of the Order of the Red Banner of Labour
Russian classical pianists
Male classical pianists
Soviet classical pianists
Russian composers
Russian male composers
Soviet composers
Soviet male composers
Russian music educators
Piano pedagogues
Jewish classical pianists
Pupils of Nikolai Zverev
Pupils of Pavel Pabst